The ARIA Dance Chart is a chart that ranks the best-performing dance singles of Australia. It is published by Australian Recording Industry Association (ARIA), an organisation who collect music data for the weekly ARIA Charts. To be eligible to appear on the chart, the recording must be a single, and be "predominantly of a dance nature, or with a featured track of a dance nature, or included in the ARIA Club Chart or a comparable overseas chart".

In 2001, eleven singles topped the chart. Public Domain's "Operation Blade (Bass in the Place...)" had the longest-running chart-topping dance single of 2001, for thirteen non-consecutive weeks. Kylie Minogue's "Can't Get You Out of My Head" and Bardot's "I Need Somebody" were the only singles to debut at the number-one spot of the chart. Debelah Morgan's "Dance With Me" appeared on the chart for five weeks, before it was removed from the chart and listed on the newly established ARIA Urban Singles Chart. Other chart-topping dance singles from 2001 include Minogue's "Can't Get You Out of My Head", which stayed at number one for ten straight weeks, and Da Muttz's "Wassuup" which spent eight weeks atop the chart.


Chart history

See also

2001 in music
List of number-one singles of 2001 (Australia)
List of number-one club tracks of 2001 (Australia)

References

ARIA Dance Singles chart
Dance 2001
Number-one dance singles